Bani Mahdi is a sub-district located in Al Qafr District, Ibb Governorate, Yemen. Bani Mahdi had a population of  2847 as of 2004.

References 

Sub-districts in Al Qafr District